Ostad Teymurtash (also Romanized as Ostād Teymūrtāsh; also known as Qal‘eh-ye Ostāhā) is a village in Badranlu Rural District, in the Central District of Bojnord County, North Khorasan Province, Iran. At the 2006 census, its population was 273, in 80 families.

References 

Populated places in Bojnord County